The 2017 Hua Hin Championships was a professional tennis tournament played on outdoor hard courts. It was the 2nd edition of the tournament, which was part of the 2017 ATP Challenger Tour and part of 2017 WTA 125K series. It took place in Hua Hin, Thailand from 6 November to 12 November 2017 for the women's tournament, and from 20 November to 26 November 2017 for the men's tournament.

Men's singles main-draw entrants

Seeds 

 1 Rankings as of 13 November 2017.

Other entrants 
The following players received wildcards into the singles main draw:
  Congsup Congcar
  Pruchya Isaro
  Jirat Navasirisomboon
  Wishaya Trongcharoenchaikul

The following player received entry into the singles main draw as a special exempt:
  Hubert Hurkacz

The following players received entry from the qualifying draw:
  Marinko Matosevic
  Hiroki Moriya
  Stéphane Robert
  Tobias Simon

WTA singles main-draw entrants

Seeds

 1 Rankings are as of 30 October 2017.

Other entrants
The following players received wildcards into the singles main draw:
  Chompoothip Jandakate
  Peangtarn Plipuech
  Wang Qiang
  Yanin Wisitwarapron
  Varatchaya Wongteanchai

The following players received entry from the qualifying draw:
  Emina Bektas 
  Veronika Kudermetova 
  Giuliana Olmos 
  Fanny Stollár

WTA doubles main-draw entrants

Seeds

 1 Rankings as of 30 October 2017.

Other entrants

The following team received wildcards into the doubles main draw:
  Chompoothip Jandakate /  Tamachan Momkoonthod

Champions

Men's singles

  John Millman def.  Andrew Whittington 6–2, 6–2.

Men's doubles

  Sanchai Ratiwatana /  Sonchat Ratiwatana def.  Austin Krajicek /  Jackson Withrow 6–4, 5–7, [10–5].

Women's singles

  Belinda Bencic def.  Hsieh Su-wei, 6–3, 6–4

Women's doubles

  Duan Yingying /  Wang Yafan def.  Dalila Jakupović /  Irina Khromacheva, 6–3, 6–3

External links 
 WTA site

 
 ATP Challenger Tour
 WTA 125K series
 in women's tennis
Tennis, ATP Challenger Tour, Hua Hin Challenger
Tennis, WTA 125K series, Hua Hin Challenger

Tennis, ATP Challenger Tour, Bangkok Challenger